Air Vice Marshal Frederick William Barnes,  (19 November 1924 – 4 August 2018) was an Australian pilot and senior Royal Australian Air Force (RAAF) officer. Having flown in the Second World War and the Korea War, he rose to become Deputy Chief of the Air Staff (1979–1981).

For his service in Korea, Barnes was awarded the Distinguished Flying Cross (DFC) and the United States Air Medal. In the 1979 Queen's Birthday Honours, he was appointed an Officer of the Order of Australia (AO) "in recognition of service as Air Officer Commanding Support Command".

References

External links
 Australian War Memorial interview
 Australians at War Film Archive interview

|-

1924 births
2018 deaths
Australian military personnel of the Korean War
Australian recipients of the Air Force Cross (United Kingdom)
Australian recipients of the Distinguished Flying Cross (United Kingdom)
Officers of the Order of Australia
Recipients of the Air Medal
Royal Australian Air Force air marshals
Royal Australian Air Force personnel of World War II